Eutopian Euphorians is the annual Cultural fest organised by Meghnad Saha Institute of Technology, held during March–April every year. The fest typically goes for 2–3 days and is held at different venues in Kolkata.

Performers
Apart from numerous college performers and dramatists, the fest witnesses the performances by some legendary guest singers and bands every year. Some of guest performers are listed below:
 Fossils
 Abhijeet
 Shreya Ghoshal
 Javed Ali
 Abhijeet Sawant
 Myrath
 Cactus
 Amit Sana
 Chandrabindu

References

External links
 Eutopian Euphorians2012
 Eutopian Euphorians2012 live

Cultural festivals in India